

The Siemens-Schuckert E.I was a German fighter aircraft, manufactured by Siemens-Schuckert.

The E type (Eindecker) monoplane first flew in late 1915. it was a monoplane with wire braced wings. powered by the Siemens-Halske Sh.I rotary engine it was armed with a single LMG 08/15 machine gun. After a successful evaluation, 20 production models were built.

Variants
 E.II  1 prototype built. Powered by 89 kW (120 hp) Argus As.II inline engine. Destroyed in an accident.
 E.III  6 built. Powered by 75 kW (100 hp) Oberursel U.I 9-cylinder rotary engine, a licence built Gnome Delta.
 E.IV  Powered by a Siemens-Halske Sh.I. Fuselage circular in cross-section project only.

Operators

Luftstreitkräfte

Specifications (E.I)

References

 Peter Gray and Owen Thetford German Aircraft of the First World War London: Putnam, 1962

External links

1000aircraft.com. Aircraft photo. Accessed March 23, 2009.

1910s German fighter aircraft
E.I
Single-engined tractor aircraft
Shoulder-wing aircraft
Aircraft first flown in 1915
Rotary-engined aircraft